Lake Success is a kettle lake in Lake Success, in Nassau County, on Long Island, in New York, United States.

Description 
Lake Success was formed during the last ice age. The name of the lake is believed to be derived from the Native American chief "Sacut."

Lake Success is the source of the name of the village it is located in: Lake Success, New York.

Lake Success marks the location where the Harbor Hill Moraine and the Ronkonkoma Moraine meet. West of Lake Success, the Harbor Hill Moraine overrode the Ronkonkoma Moraine.

See also 

 Lake Ronkonkoma – Another kettle lake on Long Island, located in neighboring Suffolk County.

References 

Success

Town of North Hempstead, New York